Kraussaria angulifera is a species of grasshopper in the family Acrididae found in Africa. The grasshopper is commonly found in the Sahelian region of West Africa, where it is known as a common pest of the pearl millet.

Human consumption 
Kraussaria angulifera is the edible grasshopper species that is most relished by the north and central Dogon people of Mali.

Gallery

References

External links 
 
 
 Names in Dogon languages, with images from Mali

Acrididae
Orthoptera of Africa
Agricultural pest insects
Edible insects
Insect pests of millets